Ormaechea is a Basque surname. Notable people with the surname include:

Agustín Ormaechea (born 1991), Uruguayan rugby union player, son of Diego
Diego Ormaechea (born 1959), former Uruguayan rugby union player, father of Agustín
Francisco de Lersundi y Ormaechea (1817 – 1874 ), Spanish noble and politician
José Eulogio Gárate Ormaechea (born 1944), former Spanish footballer
Paula Ormaechea (born 1992), Argentine tennis player

Basque-language surnames